Maura A. Hennigan (born 1952) is an American politician who currently serves as the Clerk Magistrate of Suffolk County, Massachusetts, Superior Court Criminal/Business Division. She is a former member of the Boston City Council and was a mayoral candidate in 2005. From 1987 to 1993, she was known as Maura Hennigan Casey.

Early life
Hennigan graduated from Mount Saint Joseph Academy, an all-girls, Catholic college preparatory school in Boston. She attended Salve Regina College, but did not graduate. She later earned a Bachelor of Science degree from the University of Massachusetts Amherst.

After college she became a registered dietician, interning at Boston Lying-In Hospital. She was a teacher in the Boston Public School system for seven years until she lost her job as a result of cuts following the implementation of Proposition 2½.

Political career

From 1982 through 2005, Hennigan was a member of the Boston City Council. She was first elected in November 1981, the final election when all seats were at-large. She was subsequently re-elected to nine two-year terms as the representative for District 6 (Jamaica Plain and West Roxbury). In November 2001, she successfully ran for an at-large position, and was re-elected in November 2003. She was the first woman to chair Boston's Ways and Means Committee.

In 1986 she was a candidate for Massachusetts Auditor. She finished second in a three way Democratic primary to A. Joseph DeNucci.

Hennigan unsuccessfully ran for Mayor of Boston in November 2005. She was defeated by incumbent Thomas Menino, who garnered 67% of the vote.

In 2006, Hennigan was elected Clerk of the Criminal/Business Court of Suffolk County, after defeating Assistant Clerk of Court Robert Dello-Russo. She is the ninth elected official to hold this position and the first female. She was reelected in 2012 and 2018.

Personal life

As of 2007, Hennigan hosted a weekly television show on Boston Neighborhood Network. She is the daughter of former register of probate, state senator, state representative, and Boston School Committee member James W. Hennigan Jr. She has a brother, James W. Hennigan III and a sister Helen. Her grandfather James W. Hennigan Sr. was a state senator and the namesake of the James W. Hennigan School in Jamaica Plain. She is the grandniece of William O. S. Hennigan, a member of the Boston Common Council in 1900.

References

Further reading

External links
 Hennigan election records at ourcampaigns.com

Living people
Boston City Council members
Massachusetts Democrats
Salve Regina University alumni
University of Massachusetts Amherst alumni
Women city councillors in Massachusetts
1952 births